Helge Jordal (born 17 February 1946) is a Norwegian actor. He was appointed a Knight of the Royal Order of St. Olav in 2006 for his long career as an actor both on screen and on stage, and for his position as a "grand old man" among Norwegian actors.

Career 
Jordal was born in Bergen. He is one of the most prominent Norwegian actors with a significant career. Since he graduated from the Teaterhøyskolen in 1972, he distinguished himself in several roles on the film screen, television, stage and cabaret theaters across the country. He was employed at the Nationaltheateret in Oslo (1972–77), Hålogaland Teater in Tromsø, before he came to the Den Nationale Scene (DNS) in Bergen (1981). He became a freelance actor in 1987, but has played significant roles in the DNS stage.

From the film world, he is among others known for the protagonist role in Orion's Belt (1985), for which he won both the Amanda Award 1985 for Best Actor and the Honorary Amanda in 2009, and Wayfarers (1989), both directed by Ola Solum. Many know him well from Frida - with heart in hand (1991), and he starred in film Vegas which premiered in September 2009.

Honors 
Amanda award 1985 as Best Male Actor for his role in the movie Orion's Belt
Amanda Award 1989, the Honorary Award
Royal Order of St. Olav 2006 for his long career as an actor on both screen and stage

Roles of note 
Ratigan - The Great Mouse Detective
Sebastian - The Little Mermaid
Long John Silver - Treasure Planet

References

External links

1946 births
Living people
Norwegian male stage actors
Norwegian male film actors
Norwegian male television actors
Actors from Bergen